Elle Greenaway is a fictional character from the CBS crime drama Criminal Minds, portrayed by Lola Glaudini throughout the first season and the beginning of the second season.

Background
Before joining the Behavioral Analysis Unit (BAU), Greenaway was assigned to the FBI's Seattle field office with a specialty in profiling sexual offenders, a skill that would prove to be useful to the BAU. Elle's unnamed mother is Cuban, and she is fluent in Spanish, as seen in "Machismo". Her father, Robert Greenaway, was a police officer who was killed in the line of duty. The day her father was killed, she angrily told him she hated him because he was too busy to teach her to ride her bicycle; those were the last words she ever said to him, and she has felt guilty about it ever since.

Time at the BAU
Elle Greenaway joined the BAU directly after success in the pilot episode "Extreme Aggressor". Unit Chief Jason Gideon (Mandy Patinkin), who had recently returned to active duty in the BAU, used her file as a guide and labelled her impatient, instructing her to correct the characteristic. After being hired, Greenaway quickly becomes good friends with the team's media liaison, Jennifer Jareau (A.J. Cook), and Spencer Reid (Matthew Gray Gubler).

For a year and a half, Greenaway is relatively successful in the BAU, aiding her colleagues in solving cases and capturing the criminals responsible until the season one finale, "The Fisher King (1)".

In the episode “Derailed”, Greenaway is involved in a hostage situation, when a mentally unstable man wounds his caretaker and nearly shoots her. Reid saves her life, but the caretaker is killed; both Greenaway and Reid suffer survivor's guilt for some time afterward. 

During the first season finale, Randall Garner (Charles Haid), a murderer the unit is investigating, ambushes Greenaway in her apartment and shoots her in retaliation for the BAU disobeying the "rules" to his "game"; he then reaches his fingers into her bullet wounds and writes the word "RULES" on the walls with her blood. After this trauma, Greenaway goes on a four-month leave of absence in an attempt to heal and move on with her life. Despite having physically recovered from her injuries, she remains psychologically traumatized, as seen in the post-shooting changes in her personality—once open to others and full of laughter, Greenaway becomes distant, withdrawn, and hypervigilant.

When she returns, a case involving a serial rapist affects her deeply, to the point that she panics during an undercover operation, an action that prevents the team from obtaining probable cause to hold the rapist, William Lee (Jason London), in custody. Upon seeing Lee leaving the station, Greenaway accuses Unit Chief Aaron Hotchner (Thomas Gibson) of getting her shot. Later that night, Greenaway follows Lee, who taunts her about the women he will harm now that he is free. Enraged, she shoots and kills him. When her colleagues arrive at the scene, she claims that she killed him in self-defense when he pulled a gun on her. She is ultimately found innocent, although her BAU colleagues suspect otherwise. Reid, in particular, blames himself for not having seen the signs of her impending breakdown and prevented the shooting; on a previous night, he had dropped by her room to check on her and saw that she was drinking.

A short time after the shooting — during the episode "The Boogeyman" — Greenaway resigns from the BAU, right before Hotchner is about to fire her. She turns in her badge and gun, saying she is not admitting guilt; she then says that she would not have done anything differently if she could go back to that night. Greenaway leaves the FBI, facing no legal consequences for the shooting, and is eventually replaced by Emily Prentiss (Paget Brewster).

External links
 Elle Greenaway on IMDb

Criminal Minds characters
Fictional Behavioral Analysis Unit agents
Fictional murderers
Fictional characters from New York (state)
Television characters introduced in 2005
Fictional vigilantes
Fictional characters with post-traumatic stress disorder
American female characters in television